The 2020 Swedish Golf Tour was the 35th season of the Swedish Golf Tour, a series of professional golf tournaments for women held in Sweden.

Schedule
The season saw an attempt to rebrand the existing set of tournaments as a pan-Nordic tour, and launch the Nordic Golf Tour (NGT). However, due to the COVID-19 pandemic the events outside Sweden were cancelled and the remaining Swedish events were removed from the 2020 LET Access Series (LETAS) schedule. Most tournaments held in Sweden went ahead, but with a reduced purse.

Swedish Golf Tour

Ranking
The ranking was shared between Line Toft Hansen and Louise Rydqvist.

Nordic Golf Tour

Ranking
The ranking, named the Road to Creekhouse Ladies Open, was won by Linn Grant, who earned an invitation to the Creekhouse Ladies Open at Kristianstad Golf Club on the 2021 Ladies European Tour.

References

External links
Official homepage of the Swedish Golf Tour

Swedish Golf Tour (women)
Swedish Golf Tour (women)